General elections were held in Saint Kitts-Nevis-Anguilla on 16 September 1940. The Workers' League won all the elected seats.

Electoral system
The Council had five elected members, with each island acting as a constituency; St Kitts returned three members, whilst Anguilla and Nevis returned one each. The right to vote was restricted to those over the age of 21 who had an income of at least £30 per annum, owned property with a value of at least £100, paid at least £12 of rent per year, or had paid at least 15 shillings of direct tax in the previous year.

Results

References

Saint Kitts-Nevis-Anguilla general election
1940
1940
General election
Saint Kitts-Nevis-Anguilla general election
1940 elections in the British Empire